Joshua Hughes (born November 3, 1991) is an American professional soccer player who plays  as a midfielder.

Career

College and amateur
Hughes spent his entire college career at Berry College.  He made a total of 69 appearances for the Vikings and tallied 14 goals and six assists.

He also played in the Premier Development League for Forest City London.

Professional
On April 15, 2015, Hughes signed a professional contract with NASL side Atlanta Silverbacks.  He made his professional debut on July 4, 2015 in a 2–1 defeat to the Tampa Bay Rowdies.

On March 23, 2016, Hughes joined USL club Harrisburg City Islanders where he became a regular starter for the 2016 season

Hughes spent time with MASL side Baltimore Blast in 2017, before joining USL side Nashville SC for their inaugural season. Hughes made the Nashville bench several times in 2018, but only saw action during two U.S. Open Cup matches against lower division opponents Inter Nashville FC and Mississippi Brilla.

Hughes rejoined the Blast ahead of the 2018–19 Major Arena Soccer League season.

Hughes signed with USL League One side Richmond Kickers on January 2, 2019.

References

External links
 
 Berry College bio
 USSF Development Academy bio

1991 births
Living people
American soccer players
American expatriate soccer players
Association football midfielders
Atlanta Silverbacks players
Baltimore Blast players
Berry College alumni
FC London players
Major Arena Soccer League players
Nashville SC (2018–19) players
North American Soccer League players
Penn FC players
People from Peachtree City, Georgia
Richmond Kickers players
Soccer players from Georgia (U.S. state)
Sportspeople from the Atlanta metropolitan area
USL Championship players
USL League One players
USL League Two players